The Wood River sculpin (Cottus leiopomus) is a species of freshwater ray-finned fish belonging to the family Cottidae, the typical sculpins. It is endemic to the Big Wood and Little Wood rivers and their tributaries upstream of Magic Reservoir in Blaine County, Idaho in the United States.  Its habitat is similar to other sculpins: small to medium-sized streams that are cool and have swift currents.  It is a species of concern because of its restricted distribution.

References

Freshwater fish of the United States
Cottus (fish)
Fish described in 1894
Taxa named by Charles Henry Gilbert
Taxa named by Barton Warren Evermann
Taxonomy articles created by Polbot